The Presidential and Federal Records Act Amendments of 2014 is a United States federal statute which amended the Presidential Records Act and Federal Records Act.

The act amends federal law regarding the preservation, storage, and management of federal records, specifically towards ensuring, prior to the release of records, the Archivist of the United States gives appropriate notice to both the current President of the United States and the President who was in office at the time the documentation was made. The last provision forbids officers and employees of the executive branch from using personal email accounts for government business, unless the employee copies all emails to either the originating officer or employee's government email, or to an official government record system to be recorded and archived.

The bill was introduced into the United States House of Representatives during the 113th United States Congress by the late Representative Elijah Cummings.

Provisions of the bill
This summary is based largely on the summary provided by the Congressional Research Service, a public domain source.

The Presidential and Federal Records Act Amendments of 2014 would, in section 2, amend the Presidential Records Act to require the Archivist of the United States, upon determining to make publicly available any presidential record not previously made available, to: (1) promptly provide written notice of such determination to the former President during whose term of office the record was created, to the incumbent President, and to the public; and (2) make such record available to the public within 60 days, except any record with respect to which the Archivist receives notification from a former or incumbent President of a claim of constitutionally-based privilege against disclosure. Prohibits the Archivist from making a record that is subject to such a claim publicly available unless: (1) the incumbent President withdraws a decision upholding the claim, or (2) the Archivist is otherwise directed to do so by a final court order that is not subject to appeal.

The bill would prohibit the Archivist from making available any original presidential records to anyone claiming access to them as a designated representative of a President or former President if that individual has been convicted of a crime relating to the review, retention, removal, or destruction of the records of the Archives.

The bill would prohibit the President, the Vice President, or a covered employee (i.e., the immediate staff of the President and Vice President or office advising and assisting the President or Vice President) from creating or sending a presidential or vice presidential record using a non-official electronic messaging account unless the President, Vice President, or covered employee: (1) copies an official electronic messaging account of the President, Vice President, or covered employee in the original creation or transmission of the presidential or vice presidential record; or (2) forwards a complete copy of the presidential record to an official electronic messaging account of the President, Vice President, or covered employee not later than 20 days after the original creation or transmission of the presidential or vice presidential record.

Section three of the bill would provide that the transfer to the Archivist of records by a federal agency that have historical significance shall take place as soon as practicable but not later than 30 years after the creation or receipt of such records by an agency. Expands the authority of the Archivist with respect to the creation and preservation of audio and visual records.

Section five of the bill would revise the definition of "records" for purposes of this Act to include all recorded information, regardless of form or characteristics. Makes the Archivist's determination of whether recorded information is a record binding on all federal agencies.

Section six of the bill would direct the Archivist to prescribe internal procedures to prevent the unauthorized removal of classified records from the National Archives and Records Administration (NARA) or the destruction or damage of such records, including when such records are accessed electronically. Requires such procedures to: (1) prohibit any person, other than personnel with appropriate security clearances (covered personnel), from viewing classified records in any room that is not secure, except in the presence of NARA personnel or under video surveillance, from being left alone with classified records unless under video surveillance, or from conducting any review of classified records while in the possession of any personal communication device; (2) require all persons seeking access to classified records to consent to a search of their belongings upon conclusion of their records review; and (3) require all writings prepared by persons, other than covered personnel, during the course of a review of classified records to be retained by NARA in a secure facility until such writings are determined to be unclassified, are declassified, or are securely transferred to another secure facility.

Section seven of the bill would repeal provisions authorizing the National Study Commission on Records and Documents of Federal Officials.

Section nine of the bill would transfer responsibility for records management from the Administrator of the General Services Administration (GSA) to the Archivist. Requires the transfer of records from federal agencies to the National Archives in digital or electronic form to the greatest extent possible.

Section ten of the bill would prohibit an officer or employee of an executive agency from creating or sending a record using a non-official electronic messaging account unless such officer or employee: (1) copies an official electronic messaging account of the officer or employee in the original creation or transmission of the record, or (2) forwards a complete copy of the record to an official electronic messaging account of the officer or employee not later than 20 days after the original creation or transmission of the record. Provides for disciplinary action against an agency officer or employee for an intentional violation of such prohibition.

Congressional Budget Office report
This summary is based largely on or directly quotes the summary provided by the Congressional Budget Office, as ordered reported by the Senate Committee on Homeland Security and Governmental Affairs on May 21, 2014. This is a public domain source.

H.R. 1233 would amend federal law regarding the preservation, storage, and management of federal records. The legislation would amend the Presidential Records Act to establish a process for reviewing Presidential records. The legislation also would update archival laws to accommodate the government’s use of electronic and digital communications. Finally, H.R. 1233 would require the National Archives and Records Administration (NARA) to prevent unauthorized access or removal of government records.

According to NARA, most provisions in H.R. 1233 would codify and expand current practices. Executive Orders and Presidential memoranda have directed NARA and agencies to better manage government records. Consequently, the Congressional Budget Office (CBO) estimates that implementing H.R. 1233 would have no significant cost over the next five years. The legislation could affect direct spending by agencies not funded through annual appropriations; therefore, pay-as-you-go procedures apply. The CBO estimates, however, that any net increase in spending by those agencies would not be significant. Enacting H.R. 1233 would not affect revenues.

H.R. 1233 contains no intergovernmental or private-sector mandates as defined in the Unfunded Mandates Reform Act and would impose no costs on the budgets of state, local, or tribal governments.

Legislative history
The Presidential and Federal Records Act Amendments of 2014 was introduced into the United States House of Representatives on March 18, 2013 by Rep. Elijah E. Cummings (D, MD-7). It was referred to the United States House Committee on Oversight and Government Reform. It was reported (amended) on June 25, 2013 alongside House Report 113-127. On January 14, 2014, the House voted in Roll Call Vote 18 to pass the bill 420-0. The United States Senate received the bill on January 15, 2014 and referred it to the United States Senate Committee on Homeland Security and Governmental Affairs. On September 10, 2014, the Senate voted with unanimous consent to pass an amended version of the bill, sending it back to the House for reconsideration.

Rep. Cummings, who introduced the bill, said "I applaud the Senate for passing this good government bill that will give the American people timely access to the records presidents create while they are in office."

See also
 List of bills in the 113th United States Congress
 Classified information in the United States

References

External links

 Presidential and Federal Records Act Amendments of 2014, as amended, in PDF/HTML/details in the GPO Statute Compilations collection
 Library of Congress - Thomas H.R. 1233
 beta.congress.gov H.R. 1233
 GovTrack.us H.R. 1233
 OpenCongress.org H.R. 1233
 WashingtonWatch.com H.R. 1233
 Congressional Budget Office's report on H.R. 1233
 House Report 113-127 on H.R. 1233

Acts of the 113th United States Congress